Vladislav Igorevich Marchenkov (born 29 October 1996) is a Russian skeleton racer. He competed in the 2018 Winter Olympics.

References

1996 births
Living people
Skeleton racers at the 2018 Winter Olympics
Russian male skeleton racers
Olympic skeleton racers of Russia